The Illecillewaet River  is a tributary of the Columbia River located in British Columbia, Canada.

History

The Illecillewaet has been of importance since the discovery in 1881 of an approach along the river to what is now known as the Rogers Pass across the Selkirk Mountains.  This pass, discovered by a surveyor for the Canadian Pacific Railway named Albert Bowman Rogers, ultimately became the route through the Selkirks of Canada's first transcontinental railway. In 1962 the Trans-Canada Highway was constructed along the Illecillewaet west of Rogers Pass.

Natural history
The watershed surrounding the river was quickly recognized to be of exceptional ecological significance, and Glacier National Park was established in the area in 1886, followed by Mount Revelstoke National Park in 1914.

See also
List of British Columbia rivers
List of tributaries of the Columbia River

References

Rivers of British Columbia
Columbia Country
Tributaries of the Columbia River
Kootenay Land District